In six-dimensional geometry, a pentic 6-cube is a convex uniform 6-polytope.

There are 8 pentic forms of the 6-cube.

Pentic 6-cube

The pentic 6-cube, has half of the vertices of a pentellated 6-cube, .

Alternate names 
 Stericated 6-demicube/demihexeract
 Small cellated hemihexeract (Acronym: sochax) (Jonathan Bowers)

Cartesian coordinates 
The Cartesian coordinates for the vertices, centered at the origin are coordinate permutations:
 (±1,±1,±1,±1,±1,±3)
with an odd number of plus signs.

Images

Penticantic 6-cube

The penticantic 6-cube, has half of the vertices of a penticantellated 6-cube, .

Alternate names 
 Steritruncated 6-demicube/demihexeract
 cellitruncated hemihexeract (Acronym: cathix) (Jonathan Bowers)

Cartesian coordinates 
The Cartesian coordinates for the vertices, centered at the origin are coordinate permutations:
 (±1,±1,±3,±3,±3,±5)
with an odd number of plus signs.

Images

Pentiruncic 6-cube

The pentiruncic 6-cube, has half of the vertices of a pentiruncinated 6-cube (penticantellated 6-orthoplex), .

Alternate names 
 Stericantellated 6-demicube/demihexeract
 cellirhombated hemihexeract (Acronym: crohax) (Jonathan Bowers)

Cartesian coordinates 
The Cartesian coordinates for the vertices, centered at the origin are coordinate permutations:
 (±1,±1,±1,±3,±3,±5)
with an odd number of plus signs.

Images

Pentiruncicantic 6-cube

The pentiruncicantic 6-cube, has half of the vertices of a pentiruncicantellated 6-cube or (pentiruncicantellated 6-orthoplex),

Alternate names 
 Stericantitruncated demihexeract, stericantitruncated 7-demicube
 Great cellated hemihexeract (Acronym: cagrohax) (Jonathan Bowers)

Cartesian coordinates 
The Cartesian coordinates for the vertices, centered at the origin are coordinate permutations:
 (±1,±1,±3,±3,±5,±7)
with an odd number of plus signs.

Images

Pentisteric 6-cube

The pentisteric 6-cube, has half of the vertices of a pentistericated 6-cube (pentitruncated 6-orthoplex),

Alternate names 
 Steriruncinated 6-demicube/demihexeract
 Small cellipriamated hemihexeract (Acronym: cophix) (Jonathan Bowers)

Cartesian coordinates 
The Cartesian coordinates for the vertices, centered at the origin are coordinate permutations:
 (±1,±1,±1,±1,±3,±5)
with an odd number of plus signs.

Images

Pentistericantic 6-cube

The pentistericantic 6-cube, has half of the vertices of a pentistericantellated 6-cube (pentiruncitruncated 6-orthoplex), .

Alternate names 
 Steriruncitruncated demihexeract/7-demicube
 cellitruncated hemihexeract (Acronym: capthix) (Jonathan Bowers)

Cartesian coordinates 
The Cartesian coordinates for the vertices, centered at the origin are coordinate permutations:
 (±1,±1,±3,±3,±5,±7)
with an odd number of plus signs.

Images

Pentisteriruncic 6-cube

The pentisteriruncic 6-cube, has half of the vertices of a pentisteriruncinated 6-cube (penticantitruncated 6-orthoplex), .

Alternate names 
 Steriruncicantellated 6-demicube/demihexeract
 Celliprismatorhombated hemihexeract (Acronym: caprohax) (Jonathan Bowers)

Cartesian coordinates 
The Cartesian coordinates for the vertices, centered at the origin are coordinate permutations:
 (±1,±1,±1,±3,±5,±7)
with an odd number of plus signs.

Images

Pentisteriruncicantic 6-cube

The pentisteriruncicantic 6-cube, has half of the vertices of a pentisteriruncicantellated 6-cube (pentisteriruncicantitruncated 6-orthoplex), .

Alternate names 
 Steriruncicantitruncated 6-demicube/demihexeract
 Great cellated hemihexeract (Acronym: gochax) (Jonathan Bowers)

Cartesian coordinates 
The Cartesian coordinates for the vertices, centered at the origin are coordinate permutations:
 (±1,±1,±3,±3,±5,±7)
with an odd number of plus signs.

Images

Related polytopes 

There are 47 uniform polytopes with D6 symmetry, 31 are shared by the B6 symmetry, and 16 are unique:

Notes

References 
 H.S.M. Coxeter: 
 H.S.M. Coxeter, Regular Polytopes, 3rd Edition, Dover New York, 1973 
 Kaleidoscopes: Selected Writings of H.S.M. Coxeter, edited by F. Arthur Sherk, Peter McMullen, Anthony C. Thompson, Asia Ivic Weiss, Wiley-Interscience Publication, 1995,  
 (Paper 22) H.S.M. Coxeter, Regular and Semi Regular Polytopes I, [Math. Zeit. 46 (1940) 380-407, MR 2,10]
 (Paper 23) H.S.M. Coxeter, Regular and Semi-Regular Polytopes II, [Math. Zeit. 188 (1985) 559-591]
 (Paper 24) H.S.M. Coxeter, Regular and Semi-Regular Polytopes III, [Math. Zeit. 200 (1988) 3-45]
 Norman Johnson Uniform Polytopes, Manuscript (1991)
 N.W. Johnson: The Theory of Uniform Polytopes and Honeycombs, Ph.D. 
  x3o3o *b3o3x3o3o - sochax, x3x3o *b3o3x3o3o - cathix, x3o3o *b3x3x3o3o - crohax, x3x3o *b3x3x3o3o - cagrohax, x3o3o *b3o3x3x3x - cophix, x3x3o *b3o3x3x3x - capthix, x3o3o *b3x3x3x3x - caprohax, x3x3o *b3x3x3x3o - gochax

External links 
 
 Polytopes of Various Dimensions
 Multi-dimensional Glossary

6-polytopes